The Women's keirin competition at the 2020 UCI Track Cycling World Championships was held on 1 March 2020.

Results

First round
The first round was started at 11:08. The first two riders from each qualified for the next round, all other riders moved to the repechages.

Heat 1

Heat 3

Heat 5

Heat 2

Heat 4

First round repechage
The first round repechage was started at 11:49. The first two riders in each heat qualified for the quarterfinals.

Heat 1

Heat 3

Heat 2

Heat 4

Quarterfinals
The quarterfinals were started at 14:47. The first four riders in each heat qualified for the semifinals.

Heat 1

Heat 3

Heat 2

Semifinals
The semifinals were started at 16:03. The first three riders in each heat qualified for the final, all other riders raced for places 7 to 12.

Heat 1

Heat 2

Finals
The finals were started at 16:36.

Small final

Final

References

Women's keirin
UCI Track Cycling World Championships – Women's keirin